The Salvator-Dormus M1893 also known as Skoda M1893 was a heavy machine gun of Austro-Hungarian origin. It was patented by Archduke Karl Salvator of Austria and Count George von Dormus and was manufactured by Skoda Works Plzeň. The Salvator-Dormus was chambered in the 8x50mmR round fed from an overhead magazine and was water-cooled with an oil lubrication device. There was also a pendulum adjustment in the trigger mechanism that allowed the operator to select the cyclic rate of fire, anywhere from 180 to 250 rounds per minute. The M1893 was cheaper than the Maxim gun but was gradually replaced by the Schwarzlose MG M.07/12.

One of these machine guns was taken to Peking by sailors from the SMS Zenta and used during the successful 1900 defence of the Austro-Hungarian Embassy in Peking.  Although secondary sources often cite the gun needing a stationary mounting limited to ships and fortifications, this machine gun had both a tripod and landing carriage mounting as evidenced by period photographs. It appears but is not yet confirmed that the mounting used in the successful defense at Peking during the Boxer Rebellion was a landing carriage mount with a shield. Although referred to as a "Maxim" gun, the 1893 could have easily been mistaken for such due to its brass water jacket. A 1901 photograph below shows the gun with such a brass water jacket on a light landing carriage with ammunition boxes mounted on the carriage, typical of Naval landing carriage mountings.

Sources
 
 
 
Fowler, W., Sweeny, P. (2007, 2011). "The World Encyclopedia of Rifles and Machine Guns", JG Press 
 
United States. Adjutant-General's Office. Military Information Division U.S. Government Printing Office, 1902, "Notes of Military Interest for 1901, Issue 36", page 129

Medium machine guns
Early machine guns
8 mm machine guns
World War I Austro-Hungarian infantry weapons
Machine guns of Czechoslovakia
World War I machine guns